Songs for You is the fourth studio album by American singer Tinashe, released independently through her own label Tinashe Music Inc. on November 21, 2019. It is the first project since her departure from RCA Records in February 2019. The project features collaborations with Ms Banks, 6LACK, and G-Eazy. The album has received positive reviews, with publications praising her creativity, production and songwriting, as well as for releasing music independently.

Background
After Tinashe's previous album Joyride was released, she started recording her follow-up mixtape. The mixtape was based on Tinashe's alter-ego, Nashe. Both Tinashe and Hitmaka, an executive producer on the mixtape, promoted Nashe through snippets of songs from the track list. Further promotion continued with its singles, "Like I Used To" and "Throw a Fit", both of which used the mixtape's artwork. Promotion for Nashe ceased without reason; however, speculation arose after Tinashe posted a screenshot on Instagram of a page error from RCA's website with a broken heart as the caption to the post. According to Hitmaka, the mixtape was shelved. The cancellation of Nashe, described as a "failed course-correction" by Paper, became a turning point in her decision to depart from RCA, among other reasons. In February 2019, Tinashe's then-manager Mike Nazzaro announced her departure from RCA, citing: "We initiated for her to be released. It was a positive split for her. It's giving her back creative control." After her departure, HotNewHipHop.com published an article reporting that she was in the midst of a bidding war with multiple major labels. Tinashe would eventually sign a management deal with Roc Nation on November 7, 2019. Her new team includes Roc Nation's artist management Simonne Solitro.

Songs For You features three songs — "Link Up", "Feelings", and "Cash Race" — originally intended for Tinashe's 2018 summer project Nashe, produced by Hitmaka. MadeinTYO was originally featured on the tracklist after it was teased throughout the listening parties, but the collaboration was scrapped after the producer gave the beat to another artist.

Recording
The album was recorded in Tinashe's home studio in Los Angeles. She considered her home studio as the location for the album recording as "[bringing] people into my experience, my world," and added, "I think that already set the tone for [the album], like 'OK, this is gonna be really real. This is gonna be raw.' It was truly me and that was all I was bringing to the studio, my emotions."

Release and promotion
On September 30, 2019, Tinashe announced the project along with a trailer on YouTube. Between October and November 2019, she held listening parties for her project in London, Los Angeles and New York, and stated during the parties that Songs for You is her most vulnerable project to date. In an interview with Hip Hop Mike, she stated her direction for the album as, "a real experience that they could really sink their teeth into. There are a few moments that are in your feels. I had to really open myself up. It’s the most vulnerable project I’ve ever put out."

The album was released on November 21, 2019 on a Thursday instead of the music industry's customary releases of Friday. Tinashe stated in an interview with Billboard that she wanted to emphasize her stance in the music industry as "not part of the system". The album topped the iTunes Albums chart on the night of its release; the album reached the number 1 spot in multiple countries including the US, making her the first independent artist to do so since Frank Ocean's 2016 album Blonde topped the chart.

Singles
The first single, "Die a Little Bit" featuring Ms Banks, was released as the lead single from Songs for You on October 24, 2019, with an accompanying music video directed by C Prinz. The second single, "Touch & Go" featuring 6lack, was released on November 7, 2019. "So Much Better" featuring G-Eazy was released as the third single on November 21, 2019, alongside its music video directed by Mynxii White. "Stormy Weather" was released as fourth single on December 27, 2019 with the release of an accompanied video. "Save Room for Us" was made the fifth and final single on February 14, 2020 with the release of an accompanying video, and an additional remix by Makj himself. An acoustic video for album track, "Remember When", was released on April 21, 2020.

From June 26, 2020 to July 10, 2020, a remix of a song from the album would be released each Friday. "Hopscotch" with American R&B duo THEY., "Die a Little Bit" featuring Ms Banks, with producer Zhu and "Touch & Go" featuring 6lack, with producer TARRO were released respectively a week apart from each other. All remixes came with their own accompanied short visual.

Tour
In February 2020, Tinashe announced her Tour for You in support of the album. Within one week, half of the dates were sold out. Additional tour dates were added in the United States in late February.

The Phoenix venue was moved from the Crescent Ballroom to The Van Buren due to high demand. On April 1, 2020, Tinashe announced the postponement of the tour, due to the COVID-19 pandemic.

Scheduled tour dates

Critical reception

Songs for You received positive reviews from music critics. Stereogums Chris DeVille regarded the album as sonically "[feeling] like freedom. Liberated from label meddling, she has assembled a fine reminder of what made her so likeable in the first place," and compares the overall sound for the album as "the vibe is that of an extremely talented R&B artist getting back to cooking after a deep, cleansing exhale."

Madeline Roth from MTV describes Songs for You as "Tinashe taking full creative control over her work; something she was finally able to do [...] The result, it seems, is music that comes straight from the soul."

Nylons Allison Stubblebine said that "Tinashe is the R&B superstar we've been looking for, and now that her first-ever independent album Songs for You has dropped, it's time to throw it on repeat and give her the praise she deserves. There's not a single bad song on the record: Concluding at 51 minutes, the 15-track release showcases everything Tinashe does best."

Year-end lists

Track listing
Credits adapted from Apple Music and Tidal.

Notes
"Hopscotch" contains a hidden track called "Like Me" starting at 1:53.
"Cash Race" contains a hidden track called "All Eyes On Me" starting at 1:38.
"Link Up" contains a hidden track called "Naked" starting at 2:08.
"Know Better" contains a hidden track called "Did You Notice?" starting at 2:53. 
"So Much Better" contains a hidden track called "Soul Food" starting at 2:50 and resung lyrics from "Midnight Sun", written by Tinashe, Craig Balmoris and Julian Nixon.

Charts

Release history

References

2019 albums
Tinashe albums
Albums produced by Hit-Boy
Albums produced by Hitmaka